Hugh Edmund Nelson (born 1972) is a British Anglican bishop and former charity worker. Since July 2020 he has served as Bishop of St Germans, the suffragan bishop of the Diocese of Truro.

Early life and education
Nelson was born in 1972. He studied theology at Worcester College, Oxford, graduating with a Bachelor of Arts (BA) degree in 1994. Before starting ministry in the Church of England, he spent 13 years working at L'Arche London, a charity supporting adults with learning disabilities. He trained for ordination at Ripon College Cuddesdon from 2007 to 2009.

Ordained ministry
Nelson was ordained in the Church of England as a deacon in 2009 and as a priest in 2010. From 2009 to 2012, he served his curacy across multiple parishes in the Diocese of Canterbury. From 2012 to 2020 he was Vicar of Goudhurst and Kilndown in the Diocese of Canterbury.

His appointment to St Germans was announced in January 2020; he was due be consecrated as a bishop in June 2020, but this was postponed due to the coronavirus epidemic. He was consecrated in the Chapel of Lambeth Palace to 15 July 2020. The principal consecrator was Sarah Mullally, Bishop of London, rather than the Archbishop of Canterbury: this was the first time a female bishop had led a consecration service in the Church of England. Since 20 September 2021, he has also been Bishop to the Forces.

Personal life
Nelson is married to Lizzie. Together they have four children.

References

1972 births
Living people
21st-century Church of England bishops
Bishops of St Germans
Alumni of Worcester College, Oxford
Alumni of Ripon College Cuddesdon
Bishops to the Forces